The study of electromagnetism in higher education, as a fundamental part of both physics and engineering, is typically accompanied by textbooks devoted to the subject. The American Physical Society and the American Association of Physics Teachers recommend a full year of graduate study in electromagnetism for all physics graduate students. A joint task force by those organizations in 2006 found that in 76 of the 80 US physics departments surveyed, a course using John David Jackson's Classical Electrodynamics was required for all first year graduate students. For undergraduates, there are several widely used textbooks, including David Griffiths' Introduction to Electrodynamics and Electricity and Magnetism by Edward Mills Purcell and D. J. Morin. Also at an undergraduate level, Richard Feynman's classic The Feynman Lectures on Physics is available online to read for free.

Undergraduate 

There are several widely used undergraduate textbooks in electromagnetism, including David Griffiths' Introduction to Electrodynamics as well as Electricity and Magnetism by Edward Mills Purcell and D. J. Morin. The Feynman Lectures on Physics also include a volume on electromagnetism that is available to read online for free, through the California Institute of Technology. In addition, there are popular physics textbooks that include electricity and magnetism among the material they cover, such as David Halliday and Robert Resnick's Fundamentals of Physics.

Graduate

A 2006 report by a joint taskforce between the American Physical Society and the American Association of Physics Teachers found that 76 of the 80 physics departments surveyed require a first-year graduate course in John David Jackson's Classical Electrodynamics. This made Jackson's book the most popular textbook in any field of graduate-level physics, with Herbert Goldstein's Classical Mechanics as the second most popular with adoption at 48 universities. In a 2015 review of Andrew Zangwill's Modern Electrodynamics in the American Journal of Physics, James S. Russ claims Jackson's textbook has been "[t]he classic electrodynamics text for the past four decades" and that it is "the book from which most current-generation physicists took their first course."

Engineering textbooks
According to a 2011 review of textbooks in electromagnetics and computational electromagnetics by David B. Davidson, Julius Adams Stratton's Electromagnetic Theory remains the classic text in electromagnetics and is still regularly cited. Davidson goes on to point out that Constantine A. Balanis' Advanced Engineering Electromagnetics and Roger F. Harrington's Time-Harmonic Electromagnetic Fields are standard references at the post-graduate level.

Further reading

See also

A Treatise on Electricity and Magnetism
Maxwell's equations
Classical electromagnetism and special relativity
Computational electromagnetics
History of electromagnetism
List of textbooks in classical and quantum mechanics
List of textbooks in thermodynamics and statistical mechanics
List of books on general relativity

References

Electrodynamics
Electromagnetism
Equations of physics
Lists of science textbooks
Physics-related lists